A Planet Called Utopia is a science fiction novel  by Scottish writer J. T. McIntosh, first published in August, 1979 in New York by Zebra Books.
It is the last book published by the author.

Plot
Except for radio and television signals, which are tightly screened, it has been over sixty years since the last visitor was allowed into Utopia, a world where everyone was immortal. So that the world's population would not outrun available surface area, marriage has been outlawed (because couples start to want to have a child), lifelong romances discouraged (for pretty much the same reason), and temporary personal relationships favored. Diseases are nonexistent, and cures have been found for all of them. Life involves pleasure and adventure (skiing, scuba diving, parachuting, automobile racing) all day long. The population nevertheless needs an occasional birth, so couples are allowed to have children according to a lottery system, such that the number of births is exactly equal to the number of accidental deaths in a year.

The protagonist, Hardy Cronyn, is the first off-worlder to be allowed onto the planet in sixty years. A lot of diplomatic arm wrestling led to the planet's agreement to let him land. He promised to stay out of trouble, be responsible, and not make waves. Above all, stay out of the newspaper headlines. If he has to convene press conferences, they should be scripted, and he should not say anything off the cuff, or vaguely likely to make a disturbance.

But one step off the spaceship and onto the tarmac, he does the unthinkable, and the government is suddenly plunged into damage control mode before it's too late.

1979 British novels
1979 science fiction novels
Utopian novels
Zebra Books books